The Banu Hud (the Hudid dynasty) were an Arab dynasty that ruled the  of Zaragoza from 1039 until 1110.

In 1039, under the leadership of Al-Mustain I, Sulayman ibn Hud al-Judhami, the Bani Hud seized control of Zaragoza from a rival clan, the Banu Tujib. His heirs, particularly Ahmad I al-Muqtadir (1046–1081), Yusuf al-Mutamin (1081–1085), and Al-Mustain II, Ahmad ibn Yusuf (1085–1110), were patrons of culture and the arts. The Aljafería, the royal residence erected by Ahmad I, is practically the only palace from that period to have survived almost in its entirety.

Despite their independence, the Banu Hud were forced to recognize the superiority of the kingdom of Castile and pay  to it as early as 1055. In 1086, they led the smaller kingdoms in their resistance to the Almoravids, who did not succeed in conquering Zaragoza until May 1110. The conquest represented the end of the dynasty. The last of the Banu Hud, Imad al-Dawl Abd al-Malik (Abdelmalik) Al Hud, the last king of Zaragoza, forced to abandon his capital, allied himself with the Christian kingdom of Aragon under Alfonso the Battler,  who in 1118 reconquered the city for the Christians and made it the capital of Aragon.

The last king's son, Zafadola (Sayf al-Dawla), had some territorial authority before being killed by Christians during a battle.

Between 1228 and 1237, most of al-Andalus was controlled by Ibn Hud, who claimed descent from the Banu Hud.

See also 
Taifa of Zaragoza
Taifa of Seville
Taifa of Cordoba
 The Reconquista (8th–15th century)

Notes

References
List of Muslim rulers

 
Taifa of Zaragoza
Arab dynasties